Gustine High School is a public high school in Gustine, California, United States. Gustine High School was established in 1913. Gustine High School includes a variety of about 20 clubs and 13 sports.

References

Public high schools in California
High schools in Merced County, California
1913 establishments in California